Margaret Storey may refer to:

 Margaret Storey (children's writer), writer of children's and young adult stories, including the Melinda Farbright series
 Margaret Storey (mystery writer), mystery writer, sometimes in collaboration with Jill Staynes as Elizabeth Eyre
 Margaret Hamilton Storey (1900–1960), American biologist